Philadelphia is the largest city in the U.S. state of Pennsylvania.

Philadelphia may also refer to:

Places

United States
Philadelphia County, Pennsylvania, a county coterminous with the city of the same name
Center City, Philadelphia, the old city of Philadelphia before consolidation with the county
Philadelphia, Illinois
Philadelphia, Indiana
Philadelphia, Mississippi
Philadelphia (town), New York
Philadelphia (village), New York
Philadelphia, Tennessee

Other places

Ancient 
Amman, the capital of Jordan, called Philadelphia during the Hellenistic and Roman periods
Philadelphia (Cilicia), a town and bishopric of ancient Cilicia
Philadelphia (Lydia) or Alaşehir, home of one of the seven churches of Asia Minor in the Book of Revelation
Philadelphia (Faiyum), ancient Egyptian settlement established by Pharaoh Ptolemy II Philadelphus in the 3rd century BC

Present 
Philadelphia, Tyne and Wear, a village north of Houghton-le-Spring, City of Sunderland, United Kingdom
Philadelphia, Western Cape, a town in South Africa

Former 
Philadelphia, Germany, a former village, now part of Storkow, Oder-Spree, Brandenburg

People
Philadelphia Austen Hancock (1730-1792), aunt of Jane Austen
Jacob Philadelphia, an 18th-century magician and mystic
Philadelphia Nina Robertson (1866-1951), Australian Red Cross administrator

Art, entertainment, and media
Philadelphia (band), a Christian metal band from Louisiana
Philadelphia (film), a 1993 film directed by Jonathan Demme, starring Tom Hanks and Denzel Washington
"Philadelphia", a song by Neil Young from the film Philadelphia
"Streets of Philadelphia", a song by Bruce Springsteen from the film Philadelphia
"Philadelphia", a song by alt-J from their 2022 album The Dream

 Periodicals
Philadelphia (magazine), a regional monthly magazine published in Philadelphia, Pennsylvania
Philadelphia Inquirer, a daily newspaper published in Philadelphia, Pennsylvania

 Plays
The Philadelphia, a one-act play by David Ives

Ships
 USS Philadelphia (1776), a gunboat sunk in the Battle of Valcour Island
 USS Philadelphia (1799), a 36-gun sailing frigate active in the Quasi-War
 USS Philadelphia (1861), a side-wheel steamer used in the American Civil War
 SS City of Paris (1888), a passenger liner named Philadelphia from 1901 to 1918 and again in 1919–1923
 USS Philadelphia (C-4), a protected cruiser commissioned in 1890 and in service until 1926
 USS Philadelphia (CL-41), a light cruiser commissioned 1937, active in World War II
 USS Philadelphia (SSN-690), a Los Angeles-class attack submarine commissioned in 1977 and decommissioned in 2010

Other uses
Brotherly love (philosophy)
Philadelphia Cream Cheese, a brand owned by Kraft Foods
Philadelphia chromosome, a genetic abnormality that leads to chronic myelogenous leukemia
Philadelphian cricket team, a first-class cricket team from Philadelphia, Pennsylvania, between 1878 and 1913
Philadelphia lawyer
Philadelphians, a 17th-century Protestant religious sect; sometimes called the "Philadelphian Society" or the "Philadelphia Society"
Philadelphia (Hasidic Dynasty)

See also

 

 Filadelfia (disambiguation)
 New Philadelphia (disambiguation)
 Philadelphian (disambiguation)
 Philadelphus (disambiguation)
Phillies (disambiguation)
Philly (disambiguation)